The All-WNBA Team is an annual Women's National Basketball Association (WNBA) honor bestowed on the best players in the league following every season. The voting is conducted by a panel of sportswriters and broadcasters throughout the United States. The team has been selected in every season of the league's existence, dating back to its inaugural season in 1997. The All-WNBA Team is composed of two five-woman lineups—a first and second team, comprising a total of 10 roster spots.

Through the 2021 season, all teams consisted of a center, two forwards, and two guards. On August 5, 2022, the league announced that future All-WNBA Teams would be selected without regard to player position.

Players receive five points for a first-team vote and three points for a second-team vote. As of the 2022 season, the top five players with the highest point total make the first team, with the next five making the second team.

Diana Taurasi holds the record for the most total selections with fourteen. Taurasi holds the record for the most First Team selections with ten, while Leslie follows with eight.

Selections

1997 to present

Most selections 
The following table only lists players with at least seven total selections.

See also

 List of sports awards honoring women
 All-NBA Team

References

All, Wnba Team